Faina Petryakova (September 23, 1931 — May 6, 2002) — was a distinguished professor of the Lviv Academy of Arts, a recognized figure in the field of ethnography in Ukraine and beyond, and a senior researcher of the Institute of Ethnography at the Lviv branch office of the National Academy of Sciences of Ukraine.

Legacy
Petryakova died in 2002, leaving behind a vast scientific legacy in the field of Ukrainian glass, porcelain, ceramics and Ukrainian Judaica. She has been commemorated by The Faina Petryakova Scientific Center for Judaica and Jewish Art.  The center has a collection of Judaica objects and pieces of traditional Ukrainian glass artwork.

References

Ukrainian women
Ethnographers
Academic staff of the Lviv National Academy of Arts
1931 births
2002 deaths